Sydney Warren Lotterby OBE (30 November 1926 – 28 July 2020) was a British television producer and director who produced numerous BBC comedy series.

Life and career
Lotterby was born in Paddington, London, to Winifred (née Warren) and Sidney Lotterby, a shop fitter, and grew up in Edgware, Middlesex. In 1941, on leaving Stag Lane school aged 14, he joined the BBC as a storekeeper in the electrical department at Broadcasting House, then worked in the sound control room at BBC Radio until his national service in the British Army from 1946 until 1948. After national service he returned to the BBC and became a cameraman and progressed to becoming technical manager. He joined the BBC's Entertainment Department in 1958 and in 1963, became a producer/director.

Lotterby married Marcia Dos Santos in 1997. 

He died on 28 July 2020, at the age of 93.

Production and direction
Television comedy series which he produced or directed included: As Time Goes By, May to December, Last of the Summer Wine, Yes, Minister and Yes, Prime Minister, Ever Decreasing Circles, Brush Strokes, Open All Hours, The Old Boy Network, Butterflies, Ripping Yarns, Porridge, Going Straight,  Broaden Your Mind, the final series of Some Mothers Do 'Ave 'Em, The Liver Birds, Up Pompeii! and Sykes and A....

A sketch in At Last The 1948 Show in which four exactly alike men all called Sydney Lotterby ("The Four Sydney Lotterbies") was written by John Cleese, because he liked the name. The men were played by Cleese, Marty Feldman, Tim Brooke-Taylor, and Graham Chapman. Cleese also gave the name to the character played by Robert Lindsay in Fierce Creatures (1997).

Awards
Lotterby won four BAFTA awards for comedy, including for Porridge (and also for a special in 1975), Going Straight (1978) and Yes Minister (1980).  He was also nominated for 11 more. In 1994, Lotterby was appointed OBE.

References

External links
 .
 

1926 births
2020 deaths
20th-century British Army personnel
BAFTA winners (people)
BBC television producers
British television directors
Officers of the Order of the British Empire
People from Edgware
People from Paddington